Kyalami Estates is a gated residential suburb of Johannesburg, South Africa. It is located in Region A of the City of Johannesburg Metropolitan Municipality.
The suburb has a total of 994 houses with an average of about 4 people living in each house, although it can be varying.

Kyalami Estates was built in around 1988 when Anglo American Properties conceived the idea of building a safe and secure residential accommodation for all residents.

References

 https://www.kyalamiestates.co.za/about/

Johannesburg Region A